Berita Kabwe (born 17 December 1990) is a Zimbabwean footballer who plays as a midfielder for NWFL Premiership club Rivers Angels FC and the Zimbabwe women's national team.

Club career
Kabwe has played for Flame lily in Zimbabwe and for Rivers Angels in Nigeria.

International career
Kabwe capped for Zimbabwe at senior level during the 2017 COSAFA Women's Championship.

References

1990 births
Living people
Zimbabwean women's footballers
Women's association football midfielders
Zimbabwe women's international footballers
Zimbabwean expatriate footballers
Zimbabwean expatriates in Nigeria
Expatriate women's footballers in Nigeria